Armand Douglas Hammer (born August 28, 1986) is an American actor. Hammer began his acting career with guest appearances in several television series. His first leading role was as Billy Graham in the 2008 film Billy: The Early Years, and he gained wider recognition for his portrayal of the twins Cameron and Tyler Winklevoss in David Fincher's biographical drama film The Social Network (2010), for which he won the Toronto Film Critics Association Award for Best Supporting Actor.

Hammer portrayed Clyde Tolson in the biopic J. Edgar (2011), played the title character in the western The Lone Ranger (2013), and starred as Illya Kuryakin in the action film The Man from U.N.C.L.E. (2015). In 2017, he starred in Luca Guadagnino's romantic drama Call Me by Your Name, for which he received a nomination for the Golden Globe for Best Supporting Actor and a nomination for the Independent Spirit Award for Best Supporting Male. The following year, he portrayed Martin D. Ginsburg in the biopic On the Basis of Sex (2018). On Broadway, he starred in a production of Straight White Men in 2018.

In 2021, claims of sexual abuse and cannibalistic fetishism were made against Hammer, including rape, physical and emotional abuse, and sexual violence masquerading as BDSM with a woman named Courtney Vucekovich also stating that he had asked her if she was willing to let him eat one of her ribs. In March 2021, the Los Angeles Police Department stated that he was the subject of a sexual assault investigation.
Hammer denied the allegations, calling them an "online attack". He subsequently abandoned several future projects and was dropped by his talent agency and publicist.

Early life and background
Armand Douglas Hammer was born on August 28, 1986, in Santa Monica, California. His mother, Dru Ann (née Mobley), is a former bank loan officer, and his father, Michael Armand Hammer, owns several businesses, including Knoedler Publishing and Armand Hammer Productions, a film/television production company.  He has a younger brother, Viktor, named after their great-granduncle Victor Hammer.

Hammer has described his background as "half Jewish." His paternal great-grandfather was oil tycoon and philanthropist Armand Hammer, whose parents were Jewish emigrants to the U.S. from the Russian Empire. Armand's father, Julius Hammer, was from Odessa and was an early activist in the U.S. Communist Party in New York. Armie's paternal great-grandmother was the Russian-born actress and singer Baroness Olga Vadimovna von Root (from Sevastopol), the daughter of a tsarist general. His paternal grandmother was from Texas, while his mother's family is from Tulsa, Oklahoma.

Hammer resided in Highland Park, Texas, near Dallas, for several years. When he was seven, his family moved to the Cayman Islands, where they lived for five years, and then settled in Los Angeles. While residing in the Cayman Islands, he attended Faulkner's Academy in Governor's Harbour and Grace Christian Academy (a school founded by his father) in West Bay, Grand Cayman. As a teen, he attended Los Angeles Baptist High School in the San Fernando Valley. He dropped out of high school in eleventh grade to pursue an acting career. However, he subsequently took college courses at UCLA. Hammer said his parents disowned him when he decided to leave school and take up acting but later become supportive and proud of his work.

Career

2005–2015: Early work and breakthrough
Hammer's professional acting career began with small guest appearances in the television series Arrested Development, Veronica Mars, Gossip Girl, Reaper and Desperate Housewives. His first ventures into film began with a minor role in the 2006 film Flicka, as well as co-starring in a 2008 psychological thriller, Blackout. His first leading role in film came with his portrayal of the Christian evangelist Billy Graham in Billy: The Early Years, which premiered in October 2008. The film garnered Hammer a "Faith and Values Award" nomination in the Grace Award category, which is awarded for the Most Inspiring Performance in Movie or Television by Mediaguide, an organization which provides movie reviews from a Christian perspective.

After a long search, Hammer was hand-picked in 2007 by filmmaker George Miller to star in the planned superhero film Justice League: Mortal, as Batman/Bruce Wayne. The film, which was to be directed by Miller, was eventually cancelled. The film's cancellation came in large part due to the looming 2007–08 Writers Guild of America strike as well as stalled budgetary rebate negotiations with the Australian Government. In 2009, he played Harrison Bergeron in 2081, based on the short story of the same name by author Kurt Vonnegut, which premiered at the Seattle International Film Festival.

In 2010 Hammer's breakthrough film role was in David Fincher's The Social Network, about the creation of Facebook. He portrayed the identical twins Cameron and Tyler Winklevoss, with actor Josh Pence serving as a body double during filming. The filmmakers utilized computer-generated imagery during post-production to superimpose Hammer's face over Pence's as well as the use of split-screen photography in certain scenes. In preparation for the film, Hammer stated that he had to learn how to row on both sides of a boat in order to play the twins, who are rowing champions. Hammer and Pence also went through 10 months of extensive twin boot camp in preparation for their roles, in order to "drill the subtle movements and speech patterns that the Winklevosses would have developed over two decades of genetic equality." This film earned Hammer his first critical plaudits, with Richard Corliss of Time magazine remarking that Hammer's portrayal of the twins was "an astonishingly subtle trompe l'oeil of special effects". For his role in the film, Hammer won Toronto Film Critics Association Awards for Best Supporting Actor.

His next role was that of the first associate director of the FBI, Clyde Tolson, in Clint Eastwood's 2011 film J. Edgar. The biographical drama, written by Dustin Lance Black, focused on the expansive career of J. Edgar Hoover, of which the titular role was portrayed by Leonardo DiCaprio. The acting was largely praised, with David Denby of The New Yorker calling Hammer's performance "charming", and The Hollywood Reporters Todd McCarthy describing it as "excellent". McCarthy goes on further in his review to particularly praise the chemistry between DiCaprio and Hammer, specifically in their depiction of the often speculated romantic relationship between their characters, pointing out that, "...the way the homoerotic undertones and impulses are handled is one of the best things about the film; the emotional dynamics, given all the social and political factors at play, feel entirely credible, and DiCaprio and Hammer excel during the exchanges of innuendo, covert desire, recriminations and mutual understanding." Despite this, the film received mixed reviews overall, in part due to the direction and writing, as well as pointed criticism of the makeup used to age DiCaprio and Hammer's characters. Both actors received Screen Actors Guild Awards nods.

The following year Hammer co-starred with Julia Roberts and Lily Collins in Mirror Mirror (2012), playing Prince Andrew Alcott. In January 2012, he voiced the Winklevoss twins in an episode of The Simpsons titled "The D'oh-cial Network". In 2013, Hammer was cast as the title role of Disney's, The Lone Ranger, alongside Johnny Depp as Tonto, in an adaptation of the radio and film serials Lone Ranger. The film, released theatrically in July 2013, was considered a box office failure, grossing only $260.5 million worldwide on a reported budget of $215 million. In 2015, he starred in director Guy Ritchie's The Man from U.N.C.L.E., a feature film adaptation of the 1960s TV show The Man from U.N.C.L.E., playing Illya Kuryakin, opposite Henry Cavill.

2016–2021: Independent film focus

The following year, Hammer played Sam Turner in the 2016 film The Birth of a Nation, directed by Nate Parker. The film, which premiered in competition at the Sundance Film Festival, won both the Audience Award and Grand Jury Prize in the U.S. Dramatic Competition. In January 2016, it was revealed that since 2013, Hammer was in contact with the family of the infamous drug lord Edgar Valdez Villarreal and secured the rights to film the life story of the cartel leader. He then had a role in the ensemble of Tom Ford's psychological thriller Nocturnal Animals, played Ord in the action film Free Fire, which was written and directed by Ben Wheatley, and played U.S. Marine Mike Stevens, in Mine.

In 2017, Hammer starred as Oliver in Call Me by Your Name, starring opposite Timothée Chalamet and Michael Stuhlbarg. The film, an adaptation of an André Aciman novel of the same name, was directed by Luca Guadagnino. Production began in May 2016, and the film premiered at the 2017 Sundance Film Festival. For his performance, Hammer received acclaim and nominations for the Critics' Choice Award, the Independent Spirit Award, and the Golden Globe for Best Supporting Actor. Film critic Richard Lawson of Vanity Fair asserted that Hammer utilized "his ludicrous proportions and chiseled handsomeness to great, surprisingly witty and sensitive effect." Hammer's acclaim was further echoed by Peter Travers; he wrote for Rolling Stone magazine: "a revelation, giving his most complex screen role to date the tightrope thrill of full immersion." Often highlighted was the "ridiculous chemistry" between Hammer and Chalamet, in which Christy Lemire of RogerEbert.com found the pairing successful, in part due to Hammer's skill in finding the "tricky balance between the character's swagger and his vulnerability as he gives himself over to this exciting affair." Hammer also narrated the audiobook, which was published by Macmillan Publishers.

In the same year, he voiced Jackson Storm, the main antagonist, in Disney-Pixar's animated film Cars 3, as well as starred alongside Geoffrey Rush in Stanley Tucci's Final Portrait. The film premiered at the 2017 Berlin International Film Festival and received a theatrical release the following year by Sony Pictures Classics to favorable reviews. Owen Gleiberman of Variety magazine praised Hammer's ability to "suggest turbulent eddies of thought beneath the blondish Clark Kent looks and preppie manners." The Village Voice critic found the performances "uniformly strong" and cited Hammer's portrayal of American author James Lord as the "comic highlight".

In 2018, Hammer co-starred in Boots Riley's dark comedy Sorry to Bother You alongside Lakeith Stanfield, Steven Yeun, and Tessa Thompson. Film Journal International critic Tomris Laffly described Hammer's character, Steve Lift, as an "irresistibly funny" and "coke-snorting, abominable villain". The film premiered at the Sundance Film Festival on January 20. The film won the 2019 National Board of Review's Top Ten Independent Films award and also won Best Screenplay and Best First Feature at the 2019 Independent Spirit Awards. He then appeared as David in the thriller Hotel Mumbai, about the 2008 Mumbai attacks. The film premiered at the Toronto International Film Festival on September 7, 2018. In the same year, Hammer starred alongside Felicity Jones, playing taxation law expert Martin D. Ginsburg, the spouse of Supreme Court Justice Ruth Bader Ginsburg, in On the Basis of Sex, a biographical legal drama film based on the life and early cases of Ginsburg, directed by Mimi Leder. It premiered at the AFI Fest on November 8, 2018. In June 2018, Hammer led as Drew in Straight White Men at Second Stage Theater on Broadway. For his notable film works from 2017 to 2018, Hammer was awarded "Outstanding Achievement in Cinema" by The SCAD Savannah Film Festival.

In 2019, Hammer starred in Babak Anvari's psychological horror film Wounds along with Dakota Johnson. It premiered at the Sundance Film Festival on January 26. In 2020, he starred as Maxim de Winter in an adaptation of Daphne du Maurier's Gothic romance Rebecca, directed by Ben Wheatley and co-starring Lily James; and in 2021, he appeared with Gary Oldman and Evangeline Lilly in the opioid crisis thriller Crisis.

Hammer was part of an ensemble cast in director Kenneth Branagh's 2022 adaptation of Agatha Christie's Death on the Nile.

In 2021, Hammer both dropped out of and was dropped from a number of acting productions in development, in the wake of sexual and emotional abuse allegations, including a sexual assault investigation. These included the romantic comedy Shotgun Wedding, a thriller based on The Billion Dollar Spy book by David E. Hoffman, the Broadway play The Minutes and the Paramount Plus series The Offer.

Personal life

Hammer is a son of the businessman Michael Armand Hammer and a great-grandson of the oil tycoon Armand Hammer and the singer Baroness Olga von Root.

In May 2010, Hammer married television personality Elizabeth Chambers.  The pair were introduced by Hammer's friend, artist Tyler Ramsey. They have two children. On July 10, 2020, Hammer and Chambers announced their separation via Instagram.

In 2011, Hammer was arrested at a United States Border Patrol checkpoint in West Texas after marijuana was discovered in his car. El Paso's attorney declined to prosecute the case, as the amount of marijuana Hammer had would amount to a misdemeanor. In 2013, Hammer said the arrest "was a misunderstanding of laws and interstate laws versus state laws and apparently federal laws supersede state laws."

In 2022, Hammer was living in the Cayman Islands to be near Chambers and their children; he was said to have a job selling timeshares, after a previous stint working as a manager for an apartment complex.

Abuse allegations
In January 2021, an anonymous Instagram account released screenshots it claimed were text messages Hammer had sent to various women. He denied the messages were real, and called them an online attack. The messages contained references to sexual fantasies including violence, rape, and cannibalism. A woman who claimed she was in a relationship with Hammer told The New York Posts Page Six that he had subjected her to emotional abuse, saying: "If I had a little cut on my hand, he'd like suck it or lick it. That's about as weird as we got." She said she attended a hospitalization program for post-traumatic stress disorder as a result of the relationship. Another woman who claimed to be in a relationship with Hammer for four months in 2020 also told Page Six that he wanted to "barbecue and eat her rib", and that he branded her by carving his initial "A" near her pelvis. An attorney for Hammer stated: "These assertions about Mr. Hammer are patently untrue. Any interactions with this person, or any partner of his, were completely consensual in that they were fully discussed, agreed upon, and mutually participatory."

Hammer subsequently dropped out of the upcoming film Shotgun Wedding. He also dropped out of his leading role in the Paramount+ drama miniseries The Offer, stepped away from the Starz series Gaslit and the Broadway play The Minutes, and was removed from Billion Dollar Spy. The talent agency William Morris Endeavor dropped Hammer as a client, and it was reported that his publicist would no longer represent him. In December 2021, it was revealed his role in the Taika Waititi film Next Goal Wins had been reshot, with Will Arnett taking over Hammer's role.

Also in January, the Grand Cayman police spoke to Hammer about videos leaked from his private Instagram account in which he stated he was having sexual relations with "Miss Cayman" in the Cayman Islands. The actor subsequently issued an apology in an audio message to the Cayman Compass, clarifying that the woman he referred to in the videos was not associated with the Miss Cayman Islands beauty pageant.

In March 2021, the woman who initially came forward with abuse allegations on Instagram identified herself and accused Hammer of violently raping her in April 2017. The Los Angeles Police Department (LAPD) subsequently confirmed that he was the subject of a sexual assault investigation, which had been set in motion a month prior. Hammer's legal team has denied the allegations. Attorney Gloria Allred stopped representing the woman (Effie, Efrosina Angelova) who accused Hammer of sexual assault. A source told Us Weekly, "Gloria Allred fired Effie once she wouldn't sign a declaration under perjury of her accusations." The LAPD concluded its investigation in December 2021 and sent its findings to L.A. County District Attorney; the case was reportedly weak and unlikely to lead to charges.

In April 2022, Variety ran an article where Hammer's attorney, Andrew Brettler, released a statement regarding the abuse allegations:

The 2022 documentary miniseries House of Hammer revolves around the allegations.

In February 2023, Air Mail published a piece titled "Armie Hammer Breaks His Silence" in which reporter James Kirchick examined and called into question many of the allegations of abuse. In the exclusive interview, Hammer denied the criminal elements of the accusations against him but did admit to being emotionally abusive in his relationships with the accusers. He also revealed that he had been sexually assaulted himself at age thirteen by a youth pastor.

The AirMail interview claimed that Elizabeth Chambers was behind the allegations.

Filmography

Film

Television

Video games

Theater

Awards and nominations

References

External links

 
 

1986 births
21st-century American male actors
Living people
American male film actors
American people of German-Russian descent
American people of Polish descent
American people of Russian descent
American people of Russian-Jewish descent
American people of Ukrainian-Jewish descent
American male television actors
American male voice actors
Armie
Lee Strasberg Theatre and Film Institute alumni
Male actors from Los Angeles
People from Highland Park, Texas
2021 controversies in the United States
https://www.cnn.com/2022/09/26/entertainment/armie-hammer-elizabeth-chambers/index.html